Karl Eigen (3 November 1927 – 13 May 2016) was a German farmer and politician for the Christian Democratic Union. From 1962 until 1969, he served as a member of the municipal council of Stockelsdorf. He went on to serve as a member of the Bundestag from 1972 until 1976 and 1980 until 1990. He was an early advocate of using canola oil for biodiesel.

References

1927 births
2016 deaths
People from Ostholstein
Members of the Bundestag for Schleswig-Holstein
Knights Commander of the Order of Merit of the Federal Republic of Germany
Members of the Bundestag for the Christian Democratic Union of Germany